Boguchansky District is an administrative and municipal district (raion), one of the forty-three in Krasnoyarsk Krai, Russia. It is located in the east of the krai and borders with Evenkiysky District in the north, Kezhemsky District in the east, Irkutsk Oblast in the southeast, Abansky District in the south, Taseyevsky District in the southwest, and with Motyginsky District in the west. Its administrative center is the rural locality (a selo) of Boguchany. Population:  50,503 (2002 Census);  The population of Boguchany accounts for 23.4% of the district's total population.

Geography
The district is situated in the Angara River basin.

History
The district was founded on July 4, 1927.

Government
The Head of the district is Alexander V. Bakhtin.

Demographics
As of the 2002 Census, the ethnic composition of the population was as follows:
Russians: 86.4%
Germans: 6.3%
Chuvash: 1.8%
Ukrainians: 1.4%
Mordvins: 0.7%
Belarusians: 0.6%
Tatars: 0.5%
Khakas: 0.1%

In 2009, the rate of the natural decline of the district population was 4.3 persons per 1,000 in 2006, which is in sharp contrast with the krai's average growth of 0.2 persons per 1,000.

Economy
Boguchany Dam, launched in October 2012
Boguchany Aluminium Smelter, scheduled to open in 2013

References

Notes

Sources

Districts of Krasnoyarsk Krai
States and territories established in 1927